The International Fragrance Association (IFRA) is the global representative body of the fragrance industry. It seeks to represent the collective interests of the industry and promote the safe use of fragrances through regulation.

The Association was founded in 1973 and has its head office in Geneva, Switzerland, and its operations centre in Brussels, Belgium. As of October 2022, its membership includes seven multinational companies (known as 'Regular Members') and 23 national associations. There are ten 'Supporting Members' from countries where and IFRA does not have a national association.

IFRA is led by a President, Martina Bianchini, and by a Board headed by its Chairman, Hans Holger Gliewe.

History 
In 2020, in response to the ongoing and increasing focus on sustainability in the beauty and fragrance sectors, IFRA, in association with the International Organization of the Flavor Industry (IOFI), launched the "IFRA-IOFI Sustainability Charter."

Objectives and roles 
IFRA is the official self-regulatory representative body of the fragrance industry worldwide. Its main purpose is to ensure the safety of fragrance materials through a dedicated science program. IFRA publishes a list of usage standards for fragrance materials, limiting or prohibiting the use of ingredients, based on the findings of the Research Institute of Fragrance Materials, which gathers data regarding the safety of fragrance materials.

IFRA Standards 

The most recent iteration of the IFRA standards was published in January 2022, integrating all foregoing standards up to and including the "50th Amendment." Within the standards, included ingredients are prohibited (disallowed as a fragrance ingredient), restricted (allowed as fragrance ingredient only in prescribed quantities), or have accompanying specifications regarding their use (such ingredients are only allowed if they comply with specific criteria outlined in the Standard).

Advocacy

People and structure 
IFRA's day-to-day operations are led by its President. Since 2016, this role has been occupied by Martina Bianchini, heading a team of more than ten staff members based principally in Brussels.

IFRA's main decision-making body is its Board, headed by the IFRA Chairman, Hans Holger Gliewe. The Board has twelve voting members: eight representing the Regular Members, and four regional representatives of national associations. IFRA's Treasurer is Julia Raquet of BASF.

Industry criticism

As discussed by Noy Thrupkaew, constantly evolving IFRA regulations have eliminated the mainstream use of certain perfume ingredients, resulting in perfumes being reformulated, with certain scents and advantageous chemical characteristics of banned substances proving difficult, if not impossible, to replicate.

Membership as of October 2022

Regular Members 
Robertet
Symrise
Takasago
BASF
Firmenich
Givaudan
International Flavors & Fragrances

National Associations 
Argentine Chamber of Manufacturers of Aromatic Products (CAFEPA)
Flavour & Fragrance Association of Australia & New Zealand (FFAANZ)
Brazilian Association of the Essential Oils, Fragrances and Aromas Industries (ABIFRA)
Bulgarian National Association Essential Oils, Perfumery and Cosmetics (BNAEOPC)
Fragrance Creators Association (FCA; Canada)
Fragrance Science & Advocacy Council (FSAC; Canada)
Chilean Association of Flavors and Fragrances (ACHISAF)
China Association of Flavor, Fragrance & Cosmetic Industries (CAFFCI)
Chamber of the Flavor and Fragrance Industry (CISF; Colombia)
National Union of Manufacturers of Aromatic Products (Prodarom; France)
German Association of Fragrance Manufacturers (DVRH)
Indonesian Flavor and Fragrance Association (AFFI)
National Association of Fine Chemicals Companies and Specialist Sectors (AISPEC; Italy)
Japan Flavor & Fragrance Materials Association (JFFMA)
Korea Flavor & Fragrance Association (KFFA)
National Association of Manufacturers of Aromatic Products (ANFPA; Mexico)
Association of Fragrance & Flavoring Manufacturers (NEA; Netherlands)
Flavor & Fragrance Association Singapore (FFAS)
South African Association of the Flavour & Fragrance Industry (SAAFFI)
Spanish Association of Fragrances and Food Aromas (AEFAA)
Swiss Flavour and Fragrance Industry Association (SFFIA)
Food Flavors and Fragrance Oils Manufacturers Association (AREP; Turkey)
IFRA United Kingdom (IFRA UK)
Fragrance Creators Association (FCA; USA)
Fragrance Science & Advocacy Council (FASC; USA)

References

External links 
The International Fragrance Association website

Perfumes
Fragrance
1973 establishments in Switzerland
Organisations based in Geneva
Organizations established in 1973
Cosmetic trade associations